The 1924 All-Pro Team consists of American football players chosen by various selectors as the best players at their positions for the All-Pro team of the National Football League (NFL) for the 1924 NFL season. Four players were unanimous first-team picks by both known selectors: guard Stanley Muirhead of the Dayton Triangles; quarterback Joey Sternaman of the Chicago Bears; and halfbacks Charley Way of the Frankford Yellow Jackets and Benny Boynton of the Buffalo Bisons.

Selectors and key
For the 1924 season, there are two known selectors of All-Pro Teams.  They are:

GB = A poll conducted by the Green Bay Press-Gazette identified first, second, and third teams. The selections were based on polling of 12 sports writers from cities having NFL teams and of six officials who worked NFL games during the season.

CE = Selected by E.G. Brands, a correspondent for Collyer's Eye, a sports journal published in Chicago.

Players selected by both selectors as first-team All-Pros are displayed in bold typeface. Players who have been inducted into the Pro Football Hall of Fame are designated with a "†" next to their names.

Selections by position

Ends

Tackles

Guards

Centers

Quarterbacks

Halfbacks

Fullbacks

References

All-Pro Teams
1924 National Football League season